In mathematics, a limit is the value that a function (or sequence) approaches as the input (or index) approaches some value. Limits are essential to calculus and mathematical analysis, and are used to define continuity, derivatives, and integrals.

The concept of a limit of a sequence is further generalized to the concept of a limit of a topological net, and is closely related to limit and direct limit in category theory.

In formulas, a limit of a function is usually written as

(although a few authors use "Lt" instead of "lim")
The fact that a function  approaches the limit  as  approaches  is sometimes denoted by a right arrow (→ or ), as in

History
Grégoire de Saint-Vincent gave the first definition of limit (terminus) of a geometric series in his work Opus Geometricum (1647): "The terminus of a progression is the end of the series, which none progression can reach, even not if she is continued in infinity, but which she can approach nearer than a given segment."

The modern definition of a limit goes back to Bernard Bolzano who, in 1817, introduced the basics of the epsilon-delta technique to define continuous functions. However, his work was not known during his lifetime.

Augustin-Louis Cauchy in 1821, followed by Karl Weierstrass, formalized the definition of the limit of a function which became known as the (ε, δ)-definition of limit.

The modern notation of placing the arrow below the limit symbol is due to G. H. Hardy, who introduced it in his book A Course of Pure Mathematics in 1908.

Types of limits

In sequences

Real numbers 

The expression 0.999... should be interpreted as the limit of the sequence 0.9, 0.99, 0.999, ... and so on. This sequence can be rigorously shown to have the limit 1, and therefore this expression is meaningfully interpreted as having the value 1.

Formally, suppose  is a sequence of real numbers. When the limit of the sequence exists, the real number  is the limit of this sequence if and only if for every real number , there exists a natural number  such that for all , we have .
The notation

is often used, and which is read as
"The limit of an as n approaches infinity equals L"

Not every sequence has a limit. If it does, then it is called convergent, and if it does not, then it is divergent. One can show that a convergent sequence has only one limit.

The limit of a sequence and the limit of a function are closely related. On one hand, the limit as  approaches infinity of a sequence  is simply the limit at infinity of a function —defined on the natural numbers . One such sequence would be .

Infinity as a limit 
There is also a notion of having a limit "at infinity", as opposed to at some finite . A sequence  is said to "tend to infinity" if, for each real number , known as the bound, there exists an integer  such that for each , 

That is, for every possible bound, the magnitude of the sequence eventually exceeds the bound. This is often written  or simply . Such sequences are also called unbounded.

It is possible for a sequence to be divergent, but not tend to infinity. Such sequences are called oscillatory.

For the real numbers, there are corresponding notions of tending to positive infinity and negative infinity, by removing the modulus sign from the above definition:

defines tending to positive infinity, while 

defines tending to negative infinity.

Sequences which do not tend to infinity are called bounded. Sequences which do not tend to positive infinity are called bounded above, while those which do not tend to negative infinity are bounded below.

Metric space 
The discussion of sequences above is for sequences of real numbers. The notion of limits can be defined for sequences valued in more abstract spaces. One example of a more abstract space is metric spaces.

is satisfied.

An equivalent statement is that  if the sequence of real numbers .

Example: ℝn 

Topological space 
In some sense the most abstract space in which limits can be defined are topological spaces.

is satisfied.

Function space 
This section deals with the idea of limits of sequences of functions, not to be confused with the idea of limits of functions, discussed below.

The field of functional analysis partly seeks to identify useful notions of convergence on function spaces. Given a sequence of functions  such that each is a function , suppose that there exists a function such that for each ,

However, such sequences can exhibit unexpected behavior. For example, it is possible to construct a sequence of continuous functions which has a discontinuous pointwise limit. 

Another notion of convergence is uniform convergence. The uniform distance between two functions  is the maximum difference between the two functions as the argument  is varied. That is, 

Then the sequence  is said to uniformly converge or have a uniform limit of  if  with respect to this distance. The uniform limit has "nicer" properties than the pointwise limit. For example, the uniform limit of a sequence of continuous functions is continuous.

Many different notions of convergence can be defined on function spaces. This is sometimes dependent on the  regularity of the space. Prominent examples of function spaces with some notion of convergence are Lp spaces and Sobolev space.

In functions 

Intuitively speaking, the expression

The limit is a real number  so that, given an arbitrary real number  (thought of as the "error"), there is a  such that, for any  satisfying , it holds that . This is known as the (ε, δ)-definition of limit. 

The inequality  is used to exclude  from the set of points under consideration, but some authors do not include this in their definition of limits, replacing  with simply .

It can be proven that there is an equivalent definition which makes manifest the connection between limits of sequences and limits of functions. The equivalent definition is given as follows. The limit is a real number  so that, for all sequences , the associated sequence .

One-sided limit 

It is possible to define the notion of having a "left-handed" limit ("from below"), and a notion of a "right-handed" limit ("from above"). These need not agree. An example is given by the positive indicator function, defined such that  if , and  if . At , the function has a "left-handed limit" of 0, a "right-handed limit" of 1, and its limit does not exist. Symbolically, this can be stated as

Infinity in limits of functions 

The "limit of f as x tends to positive infinity" is defined as follows. It is a real number  such that, given any real , there exists an  so that if , . Equivalently, for any sequence , we have .

The definition is given as follows. Equivalently, for any sequence , the sequence .

Nonstandard analysis 
In non-standard analysis (which involves a hyperreal enlargement of the number system), the limit of a sequence  can be expressed as the standard part of the value  of the natural extension of the sequence at an infinite hypernatural index n=H.  Thus,

Here, the standard part function "st" rounds off each finite hyperreal number to the nearest real number (the difference between them is infinitesimal). This formalizes the natural intuition that for "very large" values of the index, the terms in the sequence are "very close" to the limit value of the sequence. Conversely, the standard part of a hyperreal  represented in the ultrapower construction by a Cauchy sequence , is simply the limit of that sequence:

In this sense, taking the limit and taking the standard part are equivalent procedures.

Limit sets

Limit set of a sequence 
Let  be a sequence in a topological space .

A use of this notion is to characterize the "long-term behavior" of oscillatory sequences. For example, consider the sequence . It can be checked that it is oscillatory, so has no limit, but has limit points .

Limit set of a trajectory 
This notion is used in dynamical systems, to study limits of trajectories. Defining a trajectory to be a function , the point  is thought of as the "position" of the trajectory at "time" . The limit set of a trajectory is defined as follows. To any sequence of increasing times , there is an associated sequence of positions . If  is the limit set of the sequence  for any sequence of increasing times, then  is a limit set of the trajectory.

Technically, this is the -limit set. The corresponding limit set for sequences of decreasing time is called the -limit set.

An illustrative example is the circle trajectory: . This has no unique limit, but for each , the point  is a limit point, given by the sequence of times . But the limit points need not be attained on the trajectory. The trajectory  also has the unit circle as its limit set.

Uses 
Limits are used to define a number of important concepts in analysis.

Series 

A particular expression of interest which is formalized as the limit of a sequence is sums of infinite series. These are "infinite sums" of real numbers, generally written as

This is defined through limits as follows: given a sequence of real numbers , the sequence of partial sums is defined by

If the limit of the sequence  exists, the value of the expression  is defined to be the limit. Otherwise, the series is said to be divergent.

A classic example is the Basel problem, where . Then 

However, while for sequences there is essentially a unique notion of convergence, for series there are different notions of convergence. This is due to the fact that the expression  does not discriminate between different orderings of the sequence , while the convergence properties of the sequence of partial sums can depend on the ordering of the sequence. 

A series which converges for all orderings is called unconditionally convergent. It can be proven to be equivalent to absolute convergence. This is defined as follows. A series is absolutely convergent if  is well defined. Furthermore, all possible orderings give the same value.

Otherwise, the series is conditionally convergent.

Power series 

A useful application of the theory of sums of series is for power series. These are sums of series of the form

Often  is thought of as a complex number, and a suitable notion of convergence of complex sequences is needed.

Continuity of a function at a point 
The definition of continuity at a point is given through limits.

The above definition of a limit is true even if .

Consider the function

then  is not defined (see Indeterminate form), yet as  moves arbitrarily close to 1,  correspondingly approaches 2:

In other words,

In addition to limits at finite values, functions can also have limits at infinity. For example, consider the function

where:
 
 
 

Continuous functions 

An important class of functions when considering limits are continuous functions.

In the most general setting of topological spaces, a short proof is given below:

Then applying  to both sides gives that, for the same , for each  we have . This concludes the proof.

In real analysis, for the more concrete case of real-valued functions defined on a subset , that is, a continuous function may also be defined as a function which is continuous at every point of its domain.

Limit points 
In topology, limits are used to define limit points of a subset of a topological space, which in turn give a useful characterization of closed sets.

In a topological space , consider a subset . A point  is called a limit point if there is a sequence  in  such that .

The reason why  is defined to be in  rather than just  is illustrated by the following example. Then , and therefore is the limit of the constant sequence .

A closed set, which is defined to be the complement of an open set, is equivalently any set  which contains all its limit points.

Derivative 

The derivative is defined formally as a limit. In the scope of real analysis, the derivative is first defined for real functions  defined on a subset . If the limit

Properties

Sequences of real numbers 
For sequences of real numbers, a number of properties can be proven.
 Sum of limits is equal to limit of sum

 Product of limits is equal to limit of product

 Inverse of limit is equal to limit of inverse (as long as )

Equivalently, the function  is continuous about nonzero .

Cauchy sequences 

A property of convergent sequences of real numbers is that they are Cauchy sequences. The definition of a Cauchy sequence  is that for every real number , there is an  such that whenever , 

Informally, for any arbitrarily small error , it is possible to find an interval of diameter  such that eventually the sequence is contained within the interval. 

Cauchy sequences are closely related to convergent sequences. In fact, for sequences of real numbers they are equivalent: any Cauchy sequence is convergent. 

In general metric spaces, it continues to hold that convergent sequences are also Cauchy. But the converse is not true: not every Cauchy sequence is convergent in a general metric space. A classic counterexample is the rational numbers, with the usual distance.

A metric space in which every Cauchy sequence is also convergent, that is, Cauchy sequences are equivalent to convergent sequences, is known as a complete metric space.

One reason Cauchy sequences can be "easier to work with" than convergent sequences is that they are a property of the sequence  alone, while convergent sequences require not just the sequence  but also the limit of the sequence .

Order of convergence 
Beyond whether or not a sequence  converges to a limit , it is possible to describe how fast a sequence converges to a limit. One way to quantify this is using the order of convergence of a sequence.

A formal definition of order of convergence can be stated as follows. Suppose  is a sequence of real numbers which is convergent with limit . Furthermore,  for all . If positive constants  and  exist such that

The constant  is known as the asymptotic error constant.

Order of convergence is used for example the field of numerical analysis, in error analysis.

Computability 
Limits can be difficult to compute. There exist limit expressions whose modulus of convergence is undecidable. In recursion theory, the limit lemma proves that it is possible to encode undecidable problems using limits.

There are several theorems or tests that indicate whether the limit exists. These are known as convergence tests. Examples include the ratio test and the squeeze theorem. However they may not tell how to compute the limit.

See also 
Asymptotic analysis: a method of describing limiting behavior
Big O notation: used to describe the limiting behavior of a function when the argument tends towards a particular value or infinity
 Banach limit defined on the Banach space  that extends the usual limits.
 Convergence of random variables
 Convergent matrix
 Limit in category theory
Direct limit
Inverse limit
 Limit of a function
 One-sided limit: either of the two limits of functions of a real variable x, as x approaches a point from above or below
 List of limits: list of limits for common functions
 Squeeze theorem: finds a limit of a function via comparison with two other functions
 Limit superior and limit inferior
 Modes of convergence
 An annotated index

Notes

References

External links 

 
Convergence (mathematics)
Real analysis
Asymptotic analysis
Differential calculus
General topology